Maria Severa Onofriana (26 July 182030 November 1846), also known simply as A Severa, was a Portuguese fado singer and guitarist. She is regarded, in her short life, as the first fado singer to have risen to fame, attaining a near-mythical status after her death. Fado has been described as the Portuguese expression of "the blues", and fado roughly means 'fate'.

Biography
Maria Severa Onofriana was born in Lisbon, Portugal, in the neighborhood of Madragoa in 1820. She was the daughter of Severo Manuel and Ana Gertrudes.  Severa's father was of Portuguese Gypsy ancestry. Her mother was originally from Ovar, migrated to Lisbon with Ovar fishermen, worked as a prostitute and became the owner of a tavern. Severa's mother had the nickname A Barbuda ('the bearded woman'). Severa is said to have been a tall and gracious courtesan or prostitute, and would sing the fado in taverns where she would also play the Portuguese guitar. She is known to have had several lovers, including Francisco de Paula Portugal e Castro, 13th Count of Vimioso, who took her to bullfights (a public and important social event of that time).

She died of tuberculosis on 30 November 1846 on Rua do Capelão in Mouraria, Lisbon, at only 26 years old, and was buried in a common grave in the Alto de São João Cemetery.

In popular culture 
Maria Severa's fame grew also due to a novel by Júlio Dantas, entitled A Severa, which was then made into a play that was brought to the stage in 1901. In 1931, director Leitão de Barros turned the play into the first Portuguese film to feature sound, A Severa.

A romantic musical, Maria Severa Onofriana, opened on 19 July 2011 at the Shaw Festival in Niagara-On-The-Lake, Ontario, with book, music and lyrics by Jay Turvey and Paul Sportelli, directed by Jackie Maxwell and starring Julie Martell as Maria Severa.

References

Maria Severa musical
Fado bibliography at José Lúcio Ribeiro de Almeida – Instrumentos Musicais Populares Portugueses

1820 births
1846 deaths
19th-century Portuguese women singers
19th-century guitarists
19th-century deaths from tuberculosis
Portuguese fado guitarists
Portuguese fado singers
Portuguese people of Romani descent
Tuberculosis deaths in Portugal
Singers from Lisbon